Bex is a municipality in Switzerland.

Bex or BEX may also refer to:

People 
 Bex, a form of the given name Rebecca
 Shannon Bex (born 1980), American singer and dancer
 Bex Marshall, British musician
 Bex Taylor-Klaus (born 1994), American actress
 Bex Wilson (born 1991), British bobsleigh brakewoman
 Ray "Bex" Callister (born 1976), child actor who starred in TV series Jossy's Giants
 Bex Atwell, character in the 2005 British sitcom According to Bex
 Bex Mack, character in the 2017 American series Andi Mack

Other uses 
 Bex (compound analgesic)
 FC Bex, a football team from Switzerland
 RAF Benson (IATA code: BEX), a Royal Air Force station in England
 Business Express Airlines, a former American airline
 Jur Modo language (ISO 639 code: bex), a language of Sudan
 Bexhill railway station, a railway station in Sussex, England

See also 
 Becks (disambiguation)
 Becs (disambiguation)
 Protein BEX1 and Protein BEX2